Jonathan Alan Hodgkin (born 1949)  is a British biochemist, Professor of Genetics at the University of Oxford and an emeritus fellow of Keble College, Oxford.

Education
Hodgkin was educated at the University of Oxford where he graduated in 1971. He was awarded a PhD from the University of Cambridge in 1974 for research on the genetics of the worm Caenorhabditis elegans.

Career and research
Hodgkin was a scientist at the Medical Research Council (MRC) Laboratory of Molecular Biology in Cambridge. Hodgkin was one of the earliest researchers to explore the genetics of development in the nematode worm Caenorhabditis elegans. He first unraveled the genetic and maturational events in worm sex determination before extending his interest to other developmental pathways, behaviour and immunity.

Most Caenorhabditis elegans worms are self-fertilizing hermaphrodites, with two X chromosomes, but X0 males can also arise spontaneously, permitting genetic crosses. Hodgkin used genetic mutations in this tiny, fast-breeding species to define the regulatory cascade of genes that controls the development of male or hermaphrodite characteristics providing a model for approaching development in other species.

Since 2000, Hodgkin has focused on the nematode's response to attack by bacteria, exploring highly conserved pathways of innate immunity that are also relevant to development. Through microarray analysis, he has identified antibacterial factors produced by the worm that could be candidates for new antibiotics. He has also discovered novel pathogenic bacteria that attack nematodes, which may have potential as biological pest control agents against parasitic nematodes.

Awards and honours
Hodgkin was elected a Fellow of the Royal Society (FRS) in 1990.
In 2011, he received The Genetics Society Medal. Hodgkin was a member of the Faculty of 1000.
He was awarded the Edward Novitski Prize by the Genetics Society of America in 2017.

Personal life

Hodgkin is the son of Nobel laureate Alan Lloyd Hodgkin and the editor Marni Hodgkin.

References

British biochemists
Professors of Genetics (University of Oxford)
Fellows of Keble College, Oxford
Fellows of the Royal Society
Jonathan
Living people
1949 births
Caenorhabditis elegans
Fellows of Merton College, Oxford